Cold Hard Truth is the 56th studio album by American country music singer George Jones. The album was released on June 22, 1999, on the Asylum label.

Background
Cold Hard Truth was released only three months after Jones was involved in an accident when he crashed his sport utility vehicle near his home. He was rushed to the Vanderbilt University Medical Center, where he was released two weeks later. (In his memoir published three years earlier, Jones admitted that he sometimes had a glass of wine before dinner and that he still drank beer occasionally but insisted, "I don't squirm in my seat, fighting the urge for another drink" and speculated, "...perhaps I'm not a true alcoholic in the modern sense of the word.  Perhaps I was always just an old fashion drunk.")    Dr. Virginia Eddy commented to Jim Patterson of The Associated Press that the 67-year-old singer was "at death's door when he came in."  The doctors were astonished at the rate of his recovery.  The crash was a significant turning point, as Jones explained to Billboard in 2006: "...when I had that wreck I made up my mind, it put the fear of God in me.  No more smoking, no more drinking.  I didn't have to have no help, I made up my mind to quit.  I don't crave it."

Recording
Cold Hard Truth was Jones's first album for Asylum Records after leaving MCA Nashville and was produced by Keith Stegall.  Its most popular song was "Choices", a confessional ballad tailor-made for Jones to sing.  The music video, which features photographs of the singer throughout his life, had a more gripping resonance in light of Jones's recent drunk driving accident with lines like, "Now I'm living and dying with the choices I've made."  Radio stations began receiving calls to hear it  and the song eventually won Jones the Grammy for Best Male Country Vocal Performance.  The song was also at the center of controversy when the Country Music Association invited Jones to perform it on the awards show, but required that he perform an abridged version. Jones refused and did not attend the show. Alan Jackson was disappointed with the association's decision and halfway through his own performance during the show he signaled to his band and played part of Jones' song in protest.

Vince Gill and Patty Loveless provide background vocals on the album's closing tracks "When The Last Curtain Falls".  "You Never Know Just How Good You've Got It" was originally recorded by Tracy Byrd on his 1994 album No Ordinary Man.

Reception
After years of country radio indifference, Cold Hard Truth was released to raves and shot to number 5 on Billboard'''s country albums charts, the first Jones album to do so since Wine Colored Roses in 1986, and even hit number 53 on the Billboard Top 200 chart.  Country Weekly said of the album, "At age 67, George is singing better than ever, and proves here that there’s no substitute for experience. Cold Hard Truth is easily his most emotional and moving music in ages."  AllMusic writes that the album "returns to the sound of his classic Mercury and UA recordings, meaning that there's nothing but honky tonk ballads and ravers throughout...In short, it's the album hardcore fans have said they've always wanted Jones to make."  Don McLeese of Amazon.com agrees: "Though George Jones suffered a near-fatal collision while recording this album, Cold Hard Truth has the vocal command of an artist with a new lease of life." In a 2001 interview with Mark Binelli from Rolling Stone, Leonard Cohen asked, "Have you heard George Jones' last record Cold Hard Truth''? I love to hear an old guy lay out his situation. He has the best voice in America."

Track listing

Personnel
 Eddie Bayers – drums
 Stuart Duncan – fiddle
 Paul Franklin – steel guitar
 Vince Gill – background vocals
 Owen Hale – drums
 George Jones – acoustic guitar, lead vocals
 Patty Loveless  – background vocals
 Larry Marrs – background vocals
 Brent Mason – electric guitar
 Hargus "Pig" Robbins – piano
 John Wesley Ryles – background vocals
 Bruce Watkins, Mark Casstevens – acoustic guitar
 Glenn Worf – bass guitar

Charts

Weekly charts

Year-end charts

Certifications

References

1999 albums
George Jones albums
Albums produced by Keith Stegall
Asylum Records albums